Dangjin Citizen FC is a football club based in Dangjin, South Korea. They were founded in 2020, and currently plays in the K4 League, a semi-professional league and the fourth tier of football in South Korea.

History

Foundation (2020)
The first plan to establish a football club in the city emerged in December 2019, when the city of Dangjin announced that it wanted to set up its own franchise. In 2020, the plan became more specific and ultimately was approved by the city administration. The club was officially founded on October 14, 2020. The club's first coach was Han Sang-min. At the end of October and beginning of November, the club's management began the first player tests.

First season (2021)
In early 2021, the club announced the squad for the first season. The signed players include former professional players such as Lee In-su, Kim Chang-heon, and former Ansan Greeners FC player Bang Chan-jun. The team reached promotion to K3 League after winning a play-off match to decide the final promotion and relegation spots on K3 League and K4 League.

Current squad

Management and support staff

Honours

Domestic competitions

League
K4 League
 Play-off Promotion : 2021''' Winner

Season by season

External links
 Official website

K3 League clubs
K4 League clubs
2020 establishments in South Korea
Association football clubs established in 2020